The 1938–39 SK Rapid Wien season was the 41st season in club history.

Squad

Squad and statistics

Squad statistics

Fixtures and results

Gauliga

Tschammerpokal

References

1938-39 Rapid Wien Season
Rapid